Andy Parton (born 29 September 1983) is an English former footballer who played in the Football League for Scunthorpe United.

References

English footballers
English Football League players
1983 births
Living people
Scunthorpe United F.C. players
Stalybridge Celtic F.C. players
Scarborough F.C. players
Association football midfielders